Djalma Cavalcante (born 1957 in Brazil) was a Brazilian football player and coach.

Cavalcante died of a heart attack on August 11, 2014.

Coaching career
During his coaching career, Djalma Cavalcante has managed one of the top South African clubs, Mamelodi Sundowns. He is the only Brazilian, besides Walter da Silva, who has coached at Sundowns since the era of Zola Mahobe. He has been a manager of the Angolan club Petro Atlético as well.

References

1957 births
2014 deaths
Brazilian football managers
Atlético Petróleos de Luanda managers
C.D. Primeiro de Agosto managers
Mamelodi Sundowns F.C. managers
Expatriate soccer managers in South Africa
Expatriate football managers in Angola
Brazilian expatriates in South Africa
Brazilian expatriate sportspeople in Angola